The Tequendama Falls is a  high waterfall of the Bogotá River, located  southwest of Bogotá in the municipality of Soacha. Established in approximately 10,000 BCE, El Abra and Tequendama were the first permanent settlements in Colombia. During the month of December the falls become completely dry. The falls, once a common site for suicides, may be reached by road from Bogotá.

Muisca origin 

The name Tequendama means in Chibcha: "he who precipitated downward".
According to the Muisca religion, the waterfall was created by the legendary hero Bochica, who used his staff to break the rock and release the water that covered the Bogotá savanna. According to another legend, during the Spanish conquest and evangelization of the Americas, in order to escape the new colonial order indigenous people of the area would jump off the Salto Del Tequendama and become eagles to fly to their freedom.

Recovery of the Falls and its surroundings 

The river that feeds the falls is currently considered to be one of the most contaminated in the world.
"The Tequendama Falls has the dubious honour of being the largest wastewater falls in the world. Liquid wastes from the city are flushed untreated into the Bogotá River at the lower edge of the sabana, a few kilometres upstream of the Tequendama Falls. Downstream from Bogotá, the river is filled with sewage."

A historic hotel building, now a museum that overlooks the waterfall is undergoing restoration aided by the French government.

See also 
 Muisca religion
 Bochica
 Tequendama Falls Museum
 Tequendamita Falls
 Tequendama
 List of waterfalls by type
 Lake Iguaque

References

Bibliography

External links 

  El gran salto del Tequendama - El Espectador
 The Haunted Hotel at Tequendama Falls

Waterfalls of Colombia
Geography of Cundinamarca Department
Tourist attractions in Cundinamarca Department
Muisca and pre-Muisca sites
Waterfalls
Tequendama